The 1985 Hillsdale Chargers football team was an American football team that represented Hillsdale College in the 1985 NAIA Division I football season. In their sixth year under head coach Dick Lowry, the Chargers compiled an 11–1–1 record and won the NAIA national co-championship. In the national championship game, played on December 21, in Conway, Arkansas, Hillsdale and  played to a 10–10 tie, resulting in a split national championship. The national title was a first for Hillsdale.

Schedule

References

Hillsdale
Hillsdale Chargers football seasons
Great Lakes Intercollegiate Athletic Conference football champion seasons
NAIA Football National Champions
Hillsdale Chargers football